The 1951 Campeonato Profesional was the fourth season of Colombia's top-flight football league. 18 teams compete against one another and played each weekend. The tournament was notable for being the third year of El Dorado. Millonarios won the league for 2nd time in its history after getting 60 points. Deportes Caldas, the defending champion, was 10th with 34 points.

Background 
The tournament was the third year of El Dorado. The debutants teams were Deportes Quindío and Deportivo Samarios, while Atlético Municipal changed its name to Atlético Nacional.

Deportivo Samarios was founded by the squad of the Hungária FC when it was disbanded. The first team consisted in 10 Colombians, 8 Hungarians, 2 Yugoslavs, 1 Austrian, 1 Argentine, 1 Italian and 1 Romanian. On August 11, Universidad appointed the poet León de Greiff as executive of the team.

League system
Every team played two games against each other team, one at home and one away. Teams received two points for a win and one point for a draw. If two or more teams were tied on points, places were determined by goal difference. The team with the most points is the champion of the league.

Teams

a Municipal played its home games at Itagüí

Final standings

Results

Top goalscorers

Source: RSSSF.com Colombia 1951

References

External links 

Dimayor Official Page

Prim
Colombia
Categoría Primera A seasons